Bayview is a station on Line 4 Sheppard of the Toronto subway. It is located at 550 Sheppard Avenue East, at Bayview Avenue. It opened in 2002. Wi-Fi service is available at this station.

History 
Bayview opened on November 24, 2002, along with the other stations of the Sheppard line.

In 2013, the TTC announced plans for a second Bayview station to serve Line 5 Eglinton. Its name was changed to Leaside station in January 2016.

Station description 
Like all the other stations on the Sheppard line, Bayview is fully accessible. The main entrance on the northeast corner of Sheppard Avenue and Bayview Avenue is fully accessible, with elevator, escalator, and stair access to the west concourse level, where another elevator connects to the subway platform level. A second automatic entrance at the southeast corner of the intersection is also fully accessible, providing elevator, escalator, and stair access to the east concourse level. There is also a third entrance at the northwest corner of the intersection that is not accessible.

Architecture and art 

Stevens Group Architects designed the station with Walter Construction being the general contractor. The high-ceilinged entrance pavilion is a distinctive feature of the station, with extensive glazing and long angled roofs overhanging the structure, evoking mid-century architecture.

The public art installed at the station by Gem Campbell Terrazzo & Tile is titled From Here Right Now, consisting of a variety of trompe-l'œil illustrations on the walls and floors created by Toronto artist Panya Clark Espinal. This led travel magazine BootsnAll to declare Bayview one of the 15 most beautiful subway stops in the world in 2011.

Subway infrastructure in the vicinity 
The station itself was built by cut-and-cover but east of the station the tracks continue through dual bored tunnels toward Bessarion station, while west of the station similar tunnels go to Sheppard–Yonge station, where the tracks cross over the Yonge–University–Spadina line.

Nearby landmarks 
Nearby landmarks include the Bayview Village Shopping Centre and the Kenaston Gardens YMCA, which has an entrance directly adjacent to the station. There is no indoor access to the subway from either Bayview Village or the YMCA.

Surface connections 

A transfer is needed to connect to all bus routes at the curbside stops located directly outside the station.

TTC routes serving the station include:

References

External links 

 15 of the Most Beautiful Subway Stops in the World

Line 4 Sheppard stations
Railway stations in Canada opened in 2002
2002 establishments in Ontario